Yulia Malinovsky (Yuliya Malinovskaya; born 5 September 1975) is an Israeli politician and lawyer. She is currently a member of the Knesset for Yisrael Beiteinu.

Biography
Malinovsky was born in Voroshilovgrad in the Ukrainian SSR of the Soviet Union (today Luhansk in Ukraine). Her mother, Sophia, is Jewish, and her father, Vladimir, was of Russian, Greek and Armenian descent. She studied law at the Luhansk branch of the East Ukrainian Volodymyr Dahl National University, gaining a BA. She served in a local police force as a manpower officer.

Malinovsky immigrated to Israel from Ukraine in 1998. Her younger sister had immigrated before her with NAALE in 1997, and the rest of her immediate family joined her in Israel later. She was elected to Holon City Council on the Yisrael Beiteinu list in 2003, and was placed eighteenth on the party's list for the 2009 Knesset elections. However, the party won only 15 seats. She was 37th on the joint Likud Yisrael Beiteinu list for the 2013 Knesset elections, but again failed to win a seat.

Prior to the 2015 Knesset elections, she was placed ninth on the party's list. Although Yisrael Beiteinu won only six seats, the resignation of several MKs saw her enter the Knesset on 1 June 2016 as a replacement for Avigdor Lieberman, after he had resigned from the Knesset under the Norwegian Law following his appointment as Minister of Defense. After Lieberman resigned as Defence Minister in November 2018, he returned to the Knesset in place of Malinovsky.

Malinovsky was placed fifth on the Yisrael Beiteinu list for the April 2019 elections, and returned to the Knesset as the party won five seats. She was in fifth place again for the September 2019 elections, retaining her seat as Yisrael Beiteinu won eight seats.

Malinovsky lives in Holon, and is married with two children.

References

External links

1975 births
Living people
People from Luhansk
East Ukrainian Volodymyr Dahl National University alumni
Soviet people of Jewish descent
Ukrainian Jews
Ukrainian emigrants to Israel
Israeli lawyers
Israeli people of Ukrainian-Jewish descent
Israeli people of Armenian descent
Israeli people of Russian descent
Yisrael Beiteinu politicians
Women members of the Knesset
Members of the 20th Knesset (2015–2019)
Members of the 21st Knesset (2019)
Members of the 22nd Knesset (2019–2020)
Members of the 23rd Knesset (2020–2021)
Members of the 24th Knesset (2021–2022)
Members of the 25th Knesset (2022–)
Soviet Armenians
Soviet people of Greek descent
Jewish Israeli politicians